Raymond Thanhlira is an Indian politician. He is a Member of Parliament, representing Assam in the Rajya Sabha the upper house of India's Parliament as a member of the Indian National Congress.

References

Rajya Sabha members from Assam
Indian National Congress politicians
1917 births
Year of death missing